BRP Pangasinan (PS-31) was a  of the Philippine Navy. She was decommissioned from the U.S. Navy and transferred to the Philippine Navy in July 1948 and renamed RPS Pangasinan (E-31).

Along with other World War II-era ships of the Philippine Navy, Pangasinan was considered one of the oldest active fighting ships in the world, up until its decommissioning on 01 March 2021 after 72 years of service.

History
Commissioned in the US Navy as USS PCE-891 in 1944, and was decommissioned after World War II.

She was then transferred and commissioned into the Philippine Naval Patrol and was renamed RPS Pangasinan (E-31) in 1948. She was carried on to the Philippine Navy in 1950, and between 1965 and 1966 she was renamed as RPS Pangasinan (PS-31) using a new classification system. Again in June 1980 she was renamed BRP Pangasinan (PS-31) using a new localized prefix.

Between 1990 and 1991 the Miguel Malvar underwent major overhaul, weapons and radar systems refit, and upgrade of communications gear.

She was assigned with the Patrol Force of the Philippine Fleet, which was later renamed as the Offshore Combat Force.

The ship retired on 1 March 2021 together with 3 other ageing navy ships.

On October 30, 2022, the ship was sunk at its berth by Tropical Storm Paeng.

Notable Deployments / Exercises
On 16 July 1973, Pangasinan under the command of Lt. Cdr. Arturo Y. Capada (PN), dispatched a motor whale boat operated by ET3 Celso Rosario (PN) and rescued a Philippine Constabulary detachment of 9 troopers from Tandu Batu, Luuk, Sulu. ET3 Rosario died in the said rescue operation, which earned him the Philippine Medal of Valor.

In August 2002, she was also one of the Philippine Navy ships which rescued Filipino refugees from Sabah beating the 24 August 2002 deadline imposed by the Malaysians for undocumented workers to leave.

On 14 October 2003 while conducting patrol operations along the Philippine-Malaysian border, Pangasinan apprehended a motor launch carrying some R3.5 million worth of smuggled goods off Tawi-Tawi.

Last 20 May 2008, as part of a composite team from the Philippine Army 53rd Infantry Battalion, Philippine Navy - Naval Forces Western Mindanao, and the Philippine National Police, she joined a raid on the island of Ticala, San Pablo, Zamboanga del Sur, in order to put an end to sea robberies and extortion in the waters of Illana Bay.

In August 2019, the ship transported Relief Goods for victims of the twin Earthquakes that happened in July 2019 in Itbayat, Batanes. The goods consisted of 795 sacks of Family Food Packs, 312 boxes of Relief Supplies, 32 25-kg sacks of Rice, 10 50-kg sacks of Rice, six boxes of Sardines, eight boxes of Instant Noodles, six boxes of Instant Coffee, 30,000 liters of Mineral Water, and 92 boxes of assorted Grocery items.

Technical details
There are slight difference between the BRP Pangasinan as compared to some of her sister ships in the Philippine Navy, since her previous configuration was as a patrol craft escort (PCE), while the others are configured as rescue patrol craft escort (PCER) and minesweepers (Admirable class) ships.

Armaments
Originally the ship was armed with one forward Mk.26 /50 caliber dual purpose gun, three aft twin Mk.1 Bofors 40 mm guns, four Mk.10 20 mm  Oerlikon guns, 1 Hedgehog depth charge projector, four depth charge projectiles (K-guns) and two depth charge tracks. This configuration applies before its overhaul in the early 1990s.

During its overhaul and refit between 1990 and 1991, the Philippine Navy removed her old anti-submarine weapons and systems, and made some changes in the armament set-up. Some sources claim the loss of its three Bofors 40mm cannons during the 1990-1991 overhaul and refit period,. Final armaments fitted to the ship are one Mk.26 3"/50-caliber gun (fore), three twin Mk.1 Bofors 40 mm cannons (aft), four Mk.10 Oerlikon 20 mm cannons (2 each on bridge wings), and four M2 Browning .50 cal (12.7 mm)caliber machine guns (2 besides main bridge, 2 aft near the lower Bofors gun tub). This made the ship lighter and ideal for surface patrols, but losing her limited anti-submarine warfare capability.

Electronics
Also during the refit the ship's RCA CRM-NIA-75 surface search radar and RCA SPN-18 navigation radar was replaced by a Raytheon AN/SPS-64(V)11 surface search and navigation radar system. Later modifications included the installation of an additional Furuno navigation radar , long range and satellite communications systems, and GPS system standard to all Philippine Navy ships.

Machinery
The ship is powered by two GM 12-278A diesel engines with a combined rating of around  driving two propellers.

Gallery

References

External links
 Philippine Defense Forum
 Philippine Navy @ Hazegray.org
 DLSU ROTC
 Opus224's Unofficial Philippine Defense Page
 NavSource Online: Patrol Craft Escort Photo Archive

See also
 List of decommissioned ships of the Philippine Navy

PCE-842-class patrol craft
Ships built in Portland, Oregon
1943 ships
PCE-842-class patrol craft of the Philippine Navy
Miguel Malvar-class corvettes
Corvettes of the Philippines
Korean War amphibious warfare vessels of the Philippines